Lingoye is a village in southern Gabon. It is located in the Boumi-Louetsi Department in Ngounié Province.

Nearby towns and villages include Mahouna (2.2 nm), Mbonha (2.0 nm), Bambora (1.4 nm), Lastoursville (2.0 nm), Djokala (2.2 nm), Tsingue (1.4 nm), Missala (2.0 nm) and Limbenga (2.2 nm).

External links
Satellite map at Maplandia.com

Populated places in Ngounié Province
Boumi-Louetsi Department